Homarine (N-methyl picolinic acid betaine) is an organic compound with the chemical formula C7H7NO2. It is commonly found in aquatic organisms from phytoplankton to crustaceans, although it is not found in vertebrates.

Biological function
Homarine functions as an osmolyte by affecting the ionic strength of the cytosol and thereby maintaining osmotic pressure within the cell.

Homarine may also act as a methyl group donor in the biosynthesis of various other N-methylated chemicals, such as glycine betaine and choline. The process of methyl donation converts homarine into picolinic acid and is reversible.

Etymology
The name of this chemical comes from the initial discovery of the molecule in 1933 in lobster tissue: the word homarine as an adjective means "of, or relating to, lobsters" (i.e. genus Homarus).

References

Solutions
Biosynthesis
Physiology articles about cellular physiology
Diffusion
Methylation